Dacai Township (Mandarin: 大才回族乡) is a township in Huangzhong District, Xining, Qinghai, China. In 2010, Dacai Township had a total population of 23,577: 11,986 males and 11,591 females: 6,262 aged under 14, 16,068 aged between 15 and 65 and 1,247 aged over 65.

References 

Township-level divisions of Qinghai
Xining
Ethnic townships of the People's Republic of China